Life for Ruth is a 1962 British drama film produced by Michael Relph directed by Basil Dearden and starring Michael Craig, Patrick McGoohan and Janet Munro.

It was released in the US as Walk in the Shadow.

Plot
John Harris finds himself ostracized and placed on trial for allowing his daughter Ruth to die. His religious beliefs forbade him to give consent for a blood transfusion that would have saved her life. Doctor Brown is determined to seek justice for what he sees as the needless death of a young girl.

Cast
 Michael Craig as John Harris 
 Patrick McGoohan as Doctor Brown 
 Janet Munro as Pat Harris 
 Paul Rogers as Hart Jacobs 
 Malcolm Keen as Mr. Harris Sr 
 Megs Jenkins as Mrs. Gordon 
 Michael Bryant as John's counsel 
 Leslie Sands as Clyde 
 Norman Wooland as Counsel for the Crown 
 John Barrie as Mr. Gordon
 Walter Hudd as Judge
 Michael Aldridge as Harvard 
 Basil Dignam as Mapleton 
 Maureen Pryor as Teddy's mother
 Kenneth J. Warren as Sergeant Finley
 Ellen McIntosh as Duty sister 
 Frank Finlay as Teddy's father 
 John Welsh as Marshall
 Maurice Colbourne as Vicar 
 Freddy Ramsey as Teddy 
 Lynn Taylor as Ruth 
 Brian Wilde as Newspaper photographer (uncredited)

Production
The film was based on an original script by the husband and wife team of Janet Green and John McCormick, who had written Sapphire and Victim for Dearden and Relph. They wrote it in 1961 under the title God the Father then A Matter of Conscience.

Michael Craig had worked with Dearden and Relph on Sapphire. He says he was "surprised to be offered the film - playing a North country working class chap seemed against type - but I was delighted to do it."

Filming took place in Sunderland and Seaham Harbour Co Durham,

Reception
The film had its World Premiere on 30 August 1962 at the Leicester Square Theatre in London's West End.

Box Office
The film was a failure at the box office, contributing to the collapse of Allied Film Makers.

Critical reception
The New York Times wrote of the film, "in avoiding blatant bias, mawkish sentimentality and theatrical flamboyance, it makes a statement that is dramatic, powerful and provocative."

See also
 Jehovah's Witnesses and blood transfusions

References

External links 

Life for Ruth at Letterbox DVD
Life for Ruth at BFI
Review at Variety

1962 films
1962 drama films
1960s British films
1960s legal drama films
1960s English-language films
British drama films
Films directed by Basil Dearden
Films scored by William Alwyn
Films shot at Pinewood Studios